Redmire railway station is the current western terminus of the Wensleydale Railway and serves the village of Redmire in North Yorkshire, England. It is the second busiest station on the Wensleydale Railway in terms of passenger numbers owing to its status as the western terminus of the line.

History
The station was opened by the North Eastern Railway in 1878 as part of the Hawes extension of their route from Northallerton via Leyburn but it lost its passenger service in April 1954.

The site was redeveloped in the early 1990s by the Ministry of Defence to allow movement of military equipment by rail to and from Catterick Garrison, an operation that continues periodically to this day. Previously, the site was used as a quarry loading terminal for daily limestone trains to the British Steel (now Corus Group) plant at Redcar.  This traffic kept the 22 mile (35.6 km) branch from Northallerton open after the Beeching cuts of the 1960s claimed the remainder of the line towards Hawes but its end in December 1992 left the line's future in doubt until the MoD stepped in. The Wensleydale Railway subsequently leased the line from Railtrack and began operating passenger trains to Redmire in 2004.

Redmire Station House is now a scout-owned activity centre giving children and other charities a base for a week or weekend visit to the area. Redmire Station House is owned by 2nd Acomb Scout Group, York and run on their behalf under a Declaration of Trust with four trustees. Redmire is primarily available for Scouts, youth groups and other charities. Other connected parties can also use the facilities away from peak times. Over its 50 years as a Scout Activity Centre, it has been visited by tens of thousands of children of varying abilities and backgrounds and other charitable organisations.

It is the long-term aim of the Wensleydale Railway to re-lay the line from Redmire to Garsdale on the Settle-Carlisle Railway.

Notes

External links
http://redmirestation.house - Scout Activity Centre home page
YouTube video of Redmire Railway Station.

Heritage railway stations in North Yorkshire
Wensleydale
Railway stations in Great Britain opened in 1878
Railway stations in Great Britain closed in 1954
Railway stations in Great Britain opened in 2004
Former North Eastern Railway (UK) stations